Johnny W. Abel (January 1, 1947 – October 13, 1995) was a Canadian politician, who represented the electoral district of Vuntut Gwitchin in the Yukon Legislative Assembly from 1992 until his death in 1995. He was a member of the Yukon Party.

He served as chief of the Vuntut Gwitchin First Nation from 1978 to 1984.

Abel drowned in a canoeing accident  in 1995.

The film Arctic Son was inspired by a meeting between Andrew Walton and Johnny Abel.

References 

1947 births
1995 deaths
20th-century First Nations people
Accidental deaths in Yukon
First Nations politicians
Vuntut Gwitchin people
Indigenous leaders in Yukon
Yukon Party MLAs